Rekha Godbole is a former One Day International cricketer who represented India. She played four One Day Internationals. She scored 78 runs at an average of 26.

References

India women One Day International cricketers
Indian women cricketers
Living people
Year of birth missing (living people)